Hugh the Abbot (died 12 May 886) was a member of the Welf family, a son of Conrad I of Auxerre and Adelaide. After his father's death, his mother apparently married Robert the Strong, the margrave of Neustria. On Robert's death in 866, Hugh became the regent and guardian for Robert's sons, Odo and Robert.

Hugh entered the monastery and rose to become abbot of Saint-Germain d'Auxerre. Despite his vows, he was no peaceful, contemplative monk but the epitome of the warrior-monk of his age. King Charles the Bald sent him on a military expedition to the Nivernais. One can see in this the clerical tendency to support the reigning dynasty against the great vassals. Hugh welcomed Charles when the king had to flee during an 858 invasion of Louis the German, when his vassals refused him aid and rebelled under Robert the Strong. When Robert regained favour, Hugh was exiled to Lotharingia, where he became archbishop of Cologne (864). However, he was soon called back to France.

In 866, upon Robert's death, Hugh received all the former's abbacies, including Noirmoutiers and Saint-Martin de Tours, counties, including Tours, and the margraviate between the Seine and the Loire (Neustria). The only lands the sons of Robert inherited were in Beauce and Touraine. Despite being Robert's opponent during his life, after his death Hugh became the guardian of Robert's children. Hugh was endued with great political sense and fought the Vikings vigorously. He was the archchaplain of the royal court and one of the chief ministers of the joint-kings Louis III and Carloman. Hugh tried to maintain the alliance of the related Carolingian monarchs against the Vikings. He united all the Carolingian kingdoms against the usurper Boso of Provence. He supported Charles the Fat on his succession to West Francia in 884, but he died before he could lend aid to the defence of Paris during the siege of 885–86.

Sources
MacLean, Simon. Kingship and Politics in the Late Ninth Century: Charles the Fat and the end of the Carolingian Empire. Cambridge University Press: 2003.

886 deaths
Bishops in the Carolingian Empire
Elder House of Welf
Archbishops of Cologne
Year of birth unknown